Carnet B was the main instrument for monitoring "suspects", French or foreign, under the French Third Republic. It was created in 1886 by General Georges Ernest Boulanger, to fight against espionage activities. Managed by the Ministry of the Interior, it is gradually being extended to all individuals capable of disturbing public order or antimilitarists who could oppose national mobilization. On August 1, 1914, Interior Minister Louis Malvy decided not to implement it when the World War I broke out. At the end of the war, it was kept and taken back for general surveillance, especially of foreigners. It was repealed in 1947.

References

Anti-militarism
French Third Republic
Surveillance databases
France in World War I